Wes Enzinna is a journalist and literary non-fiction writer. His stories have appeared on the covers of The New York Times Magazine and Harper's Magazine. He was the deputy editor of Vice Media, and a senior editor and writer at Mother Jones. His international reporting has won support from the Pulitzer Center on Crisis Reporting, and he has appeared to discuss his reporting on extremism in the United States in interviews with NPR and Larry King.

Achievements and honors 
Enzinna' work has twice been selected as notable in the Best American anthology series. He is a recipient of a Middlebury Fellowship in Environmental Reporting.

References 

American magazine writers
American male journalists
University of California, Berkeley alumni
Living people
Year of birth missing (living people)
Place of birth missing (living people)